In the run up to the 2015 Danish general election, various organisations are carrying out opinion polling to gauge voting intention in Denmark. Results of such polls are given in this article.

Poll results

See also 
Opinion polling for the 2019 Danish general election
Opinion polling for the next Danish general election

References

2015
Denmark